Aung Than is a Burmese professor of dentistry, and the first rector of the Institute of Medicine, Yangon from 1964 to 1982. He later became the Burmese ambassador to Australia.

See also
 Myanmar Dental Association
 Myanmar Dental Council

References

Bibliography
 
 

Burmese dental professors
University of Pennsylvania School of Dental Medicine alumni